Chae Song-hak is a North Korean politician who has served as the President of the Central Bank of the Democratic People's Republic of Korea since 2021. He is therefore an ex officio member of the Cabinet of North Korea. He was also the Vice Chairman of the Port Authority of Rason City from 2005 to 2010.

Career

Rason City 
As the Vice Chairman of the Port Authority in Rason, Chae was reportedly instrumental in the idea and establisment of its free-trade zone.

President of the Central Bank 
Chae was appointed as President of the Central Bank in January 2021 to succeed Kim Chon-gyun. Due to his position, he then became a member of the 14th Cabinet of North Korea. He was also named as a member of the Central Committee.

References 

North Korean politicians
North Korean bankers
Year of birth missing (living people)
Living people